Crandallite is a calcium aluminium basic phosphate mineral. It has ideal formula . 
Crandallite was named after Milan L. Crandall, Jr, who worked for Knight Syndicate.
This mineral is found in laterite and in alteration products of phosphate rich pegmatites.

References

Phosphate minerals
Crandallite group